Frank Emley (1861, in Durham – 1938, in Bedford) was an English architect, who played an important part in designing several buildings in early Johannesburg in the practices of Leck and Emley and Emley and Williamson.

Early life
Emley worked as an assistant in his father's firm which specialised in church fittings. He is only known to have designed one building in England, Corbridge Town Hall.

Style
During his time in Johannesburg, Emley designed masterpieces in a variety of styles, ranging from the Victorian Eclecticism of Hohenheim, to the grand Edwardian Baroque of the Rand Club, The Neo-Classicism of The university of the Witwatersrand to his Art Deco sky scrapers of the 1930s.

List of important buildings
 Hohenheim/House Lionel Phillips - 1892
 The First Chamber of Mines Building - 1894 (Emley and Scott)
 Sunnyside/House Hennen Jennings - 1895
 The Third Corner House building - 1903 (Leck and Emley)
 The Third Rand Club Building - 1905 (Leck and Emley)
 Savernake - 1904 (Leck and Emley)
 Emoyeni/House Henry Hull - 1905 (Leck and Emley)
 University of the Witwatersrand Central Block - 1922 (Emley and Williamson)
 Union House - 1933 (Emley and Williamson)
 Castle Mansions - 1935 (Emley and Williamson)
 Lauriston Court - 1934 (Emley and Williamson)
 The Aegis building - 1934 (Emley and Williamson)
 The Third Anstey's Building - 1937 (Emley and Williamson)
 Manner's Mansions - 1939 (Emley and Williamson)

References

External links
 Emley, Frank
 Leck and Emley
 Emley and Williamson

1861 births
1938 deaths
Architects from County Durham
People from Durham, England